Thomas Nisbit "Tom" Kiefer (born February 25, 1958 in Sharon, Connecticut) is a former American competitive rower and Olympic silver medalist.

Career
At the 1984 Summer Olympics, Kiefer finished in 2nd place in the men's coxed fours competition with Edward Ives, Michael Bach, Gregory Springer, and John Stillings.

Kiefer won 3 bronze medals at the World Rowing Championships during his career in the US men’s 8s. In doing so he was the first American rower to win 3 medals in the men’s 8 at the World Rowing Championship.

Personal
Kiefer grew up in Salisbury, Connecticut where he participated in the Salisbury Winter Sports Association as a cross country skier. He attended Salisbury school and furthered his education at Northeastern University. Kiefer  has four kids: three girls (Madison, Ellery, and Oralye) and one boy (Emerson).

References

1958 births
Living people
Rowers at the 1984 Summer Olympics
Olympic silver medalists for the United States in rowing
American male rowers
Medalists at the 1984 Summer Olympics
World Rowing Championships medalists for the United States